The following is a list of notable galaxies.

There are about 51 galaxies in the Local Group (see list of nearest galaxies for a complete list), on the order of 100,000 in the Local Supercluster, and an estimated 100 billion in all of the observable universe.

The discovery of the nature of galaxies as distinct from other nebulae (interstellar clouds) was made in the 1920s. The first attempts at systematic catalogues of galaxies were made in the 1960s, with the Catalogue of Galaxies and Clusters of Galaxies listing 29,418 galaxies and galaxy clusters, and with the Morphological Catalogue of Galaxies, a putatively complete list of galaxies with photographic magnitude above 15, listing 30,642. In the 1980s, the Lyons Groups of Galaxies listed 485 galaxy groups with 3,933 member galaxies. Galaxy Zoo is a project aiming at a more comprehensive list: launched in July 2007, it has classified over one million galaxy images from The Sloan Digital Sky Survey, The Hubble Space Telescope and the Cosmic Assembly Near-Infrared Deep Extragalactic Legacy Survey.

There is no universal naming convention for galaxies, as they are mostly catalogued before it is established whether the object is or isn't a galaxy. Mostly they are identified by their celestial coordinates together with the name of the observing project (HUDF, SDSS, 3C, CFHQS, NGC/IC, etc.)


Named galaxies
This is a list of galaxies that are well known by something other than an entry in a catalog or list, or a set of coordinates, or a systematic designation.

Naked-eye galaxies
This is a list of galaxies that are visible to the naked eye, for at the very least, keen-eyed observers in a very dark-sky environment that is high in altitude, during clear and stable weather.

 Sagittarius Dwarf Spheroidal Galaxy is not listed, because it is not discernible as being a separate galaxy in the sky.

Observational firsts

Prototypes
This is a list of galaxies that became prototypes for a class of galaxies.

Closest and most distant-known galaxies by type

Closest galaxies

Most distant galaxies

Timeline notes
 MACS0647-JD, discovered in 2012, with z=10.7, does not appear on this list because it has not been confirmed with a spectroscopic redshift.
 UDFy-38135539, discovered in 2009, with z=8.6, does not appear on this list because its claimed redshift is disputed. Follow-up observations have failed to replicate the cited redshift measurement.
 A1689-zD1, discovered in 2008, with z=7.6, does not appear on this list because it has not been confirmed with a spectroscopic redshift.
 Abell 68 c1 and Abell 2219 c1, discovered in 2007, with z=9, do not appear on this list because they have not been confirmed.
 IOK4 and IOK5, discovered in 2007, with z=7, do not appear on this list because they have not been confirmed with a spectroscopic redshift.
 Abell 1835 IR1916, discovered in 2004, with z=10.0, does not appear on this list because its claimed redshift is disputed. Some follow-up observations have failed to find the object at all.
 STIS 123627+621755, discovered in 1999, with z=6.68, does not appear on this list because its redshift was based on an erroneous interpretation of an oxygen emission line as a hydrogen emission line.

 BR1202-0725 LAE, discovered in 1998 at z=5.64 does not appear on the list because it was not definitively pinned. BR1202-0725 (QSO 1202-07) refers to a quasar that the Lyman alpha emitting galaxy is near. The quasar itself lies at z=4.6947
 BR2237-0607 LA1 and BR2237-0607 LA2 were found at z=4.55 while investigating around the quasar BR2237-0607 in 1996. Neither of these appear on the list because they were not definitively pinned down at the time. The quasar itself lies at z=4.558

 Two absorption dropouts in the spectrum of quasar BR 1202-07 (QSO 1202-0725, BRI 1202-0725, BRI1202-07) were found, one in early 1996, another later in 1996. Neither of these appear on the list because they were not definitively pinned down at the time. The early one was at z=4.38, the later one at z=4.687, the quasar itself lies at z=4.695

 In 1986, a gravitationally lensed galaxy forming a blue arc was found lensed by galaxy cluster CL 2224-02 (C12224 in some references). However, its redshift was only determined in 1991, at z=2.237, by which time, it would no longer be the most distant galaxy known.

 An absorption drop was discovered in 1985 in the light spectrum of quasar PKS 1614+051 at z=3.21 This does not appear on the list because it was not definitively fixed down. At the time, it was claimed to be the first non-QSO galaxy found beyond redshift 3. The quasar itself is at z=3.197

 In 1975, 3C 123 was incorrectly determined to lie at z=0.637 (actually z=0.218).

 From 1964 to 1997, the title of most distant object in the universe was held by a succession of quasars. That list is available at list of quasars.
 In 1958, clusters Cl 0024+1654 and Cl 1447+2619 were estimated to have redshifts of z=0.29 and z=0.35, respectively. However, no galaxy was spectroscopically determined.

Galaxies by brightness and power

Galaxies by mass and density

Galaxies by size

Field galaxies

A field galaxy is a galaxy that does not belong to a larger cluster of galaxies and hence is gravitationally alone.

Interacting galaxies

Galaxy mergers

Galaxies with some other notable feature

See also 

 Galaxy
 Galaxy groups and clusters
 Illustris project
 List of galaxy groups and clusters
 List of galaxy superclusters
 Lists of astronomical objects
 Local Group
 Milky Way Galaxy
 Supercluster
 Virgo Supercluster

Lists of galaxies 

 Local Group
 List of largest galaxies
 List of nearest galaxies
 List of polar-ring galaxies
 List of spiral galaxies
 List of ring galaxies
 List of quasars

Notes

References

External links 
 Wolfram Research: Scientific Astronomer Documentations – Brightest Galaxies
 1956 Catalogue of Galaxy Redshifts: Redshifts and magnitudes of extragalactic nebulae by Milton L. Humason, Nicholas U. Mayall, Allan Sandage
 1936 Catalogue of Galaxy Redshifts: The Apparent Radial Velocities of 100 Extra-Galactic Nebulae by Milton L. Humason
 1925 Catalogue of Galaxy Redshifts: [ ] by Vesto Slipher
 (1917) First Catalogue of Galaxy Redshifts: Nebulae by Vesto Slipher
 Interactive Map of the Visible Universe with Galaxies: Deep Space Map